De Girolamo is the name of several people:

Danilo De Girolamo (1956–2012), Italian voice actor
Diego De Girolamo (born 1995), professional footballer
Nunzia De Girolamo (born 1975), Italian lawyer
Scott, De Girolamo (born 1964), scientist and CEO of CGPC Solutions